The Haagse Kunstkring (English The Hague Art Circle) is an association in The Hague for artists and art lovers. Among the members are visual artists, architects, writers, recitation artists, photographers, musicians and designers.

The association was founded in 1891, among others, by artist Théophile de Bock and architect .

In 1892, Jan Toorop organized the first retrospective exhibition of Vincent van Gogh, although at that time this work was still unknown and most controversial.

In 1923, Kurt Schwitters and Theo van Doesburg in the Kunstkring held the first Dada-meeting in the Netherlands, which was of great influence on the renewal of art in the Netherlands.

From 1926 to 1932 the artist Albert Vogel Sr. (1874-1933) served as chairman of the art circle.

To mark the 100th anniversary of the Hague Art Circle, the society was awarded the Medal of the City of The Hague.

Famous members 
 Cor Alons, industrial designer
 Hendrik Petrus Berlage, architect
 Leonora van Bijsterveld ; her inheritance (1957) allows the Kunstkring could buy a building at the Denneweg. The Art Society is still there.
 Theo van Doesburg, painter
 Pierre H. Dubois, writer
 Vilmos Huszár, painter, designer
 Herman van der Kloot Meijburg, architect
 Arnold Hendrik Koning, painter
 Max Koot, photographer
 Han van Meegeren, painter and forger
 Jan Wils, architect
 Hendrik Wouda, architect and furniture designer
 Piet Zwart, typographer

See also 
 Pulchri Studio

References

External links 

 
 Honorary members and members of merit

Clubs and societies in the Netherlands
Art societies
Dutch artist groups and collectives